Agnorisma bugrai, the collard dart, is a moth of the family Noctuidae. The species was first described by Ahmet Ömer Koçak in 1983. It has a transcontinental distribution in North America, from central Canada and the northern United States, southward in the Rocky Mountains to Colorado.

The wingspan is about 25 mm. Adults are on wing from August to September depending on the location.

References

"Agnorisma bugrai (Kaçak 1983)". Moths of North Dakota. Retrieved November 13, 2020. 

Noctuinae
Moths of North America
Moths described in 1983